Felix Christian Herbert Iversen (22 October 1887 – 31 July 1973) was a Finnish mathematician and a pacifist. He was a student of Ernst Lindelöf, and later an associate professor of mathematics at the University of Helsinki. Although he stopped performing serious research in mathematics around 1922, he continued working as a professor until his retirement in 1954 and published a textbook on mathematics in 1950. The Soviet Union awarded Felix Iversen the Stalin Peace Prize in 1954.

References

1887 births
1973 deaths
Finnish mathematicians
Academic staff of the University of Helsinki
Stalin Peace Prize recipients